"Joke" is a comedy sketch written and performed by English comedians Rowan Atkinson and Richard Curtis. It was performed live during Atkinson's 1980 tour of the United Kingdom. A live recording was made at the Grand Opera House in Belfast, Northern Ireland, on 19 or 20 September 1980 and released as the last track on Atkinson's live comedy album, Live in Belfast.

Synopsis
At the start of the sketch, Rowan Atkinson's character tells Richard Curtis' character he's "got a joke". He goes on to explain, "It's one of those ones where I ask a question and you say 'I don't know, dot, dot, dot, dot, dot, dot'." Rowan begins the joke by saying, "I say, I say, I say, what is the secret of great comedy?" Richard replies by literally saying, "I don't know, dot, dot, dot, dot, dot, dot." After laughing at his own wit, Richard tells the annoyed Rowan that he'll "do it again." Rowan repeats the question and Richard replies, "I don't know. What is the secret to great comedy?" However, before Richard can finish his reply, Rowan interrupts, "timing." The point of the joke is that Rowan deliberately got his timing wrong when saying that timing is the secret to great comedy; however, Richard does not understand the joke. Bewildered by Richard's stupidity, Rowan enquires, "But didn't you see?" "Sorry, was it a visual joke?" Richard replies, still confused. After trying the joke a third time, Richard still does not understand the irony of the joke. Annoyed by Richard, Rowan asks, "Don't you think that's a clever joke?" to which Richard replies, "Clever... no. Joke... no." Disheartened by his joke falling flat with Richard, he claims "it was very funny when Michael told it," then makes the excuse that his timing might be out to which Richard replies, "It could be other factors like the complete absence of anything funny in the joke." Rowan proclaims, "It's so difficult telling jokes," before suddenly exclaiming that he has another joke that is "far more straightforward" to which Richard replies, "As long as it's funny, I don't mind."

The second joke begins with Rowan saying, "Knock! Knock! Who's there? Death..." but he is interrupted by Richard who complains that knock-knock jokes "are meant to be two-handers". Rowan argues that this joke "doesn't work that way". It becomes apparent that Rowan is attempting to tell the same joke told by Toby, the Devil, during a previous sketch. The joke is meant to go "Knock, Knock. Who's there? Death. Death wh..." at which point the person telling the joke pretends to die. If a second person was replying in the joke, they would not know to pretend to die when saying "Death who?". Richard protests and Rowan gives in and the pair attempt the knock-knock joke in the "old way". Richard, ignorant to the fact he is meant to say the punch line, replies "Death who?" and Rowan replies "Ah, now, that's where it goes wrong." Rowan explains to Richard how he is meant to say the punch-line but after another attempt at the joke, Richard replies wrong. Rowan, getting increasingly more annoyed as the sketch goes on, says he has another joke and this time he will be "third time lucky".

Rowan explains that the third joke is "a very old joke but a very good joke". Rowan begins to tell the classic joke, which begins "I say, I say, I say, my wife's gone to Jamaica". The person replying is meant to say, "Jamaica?" which sounds like "D'you make 'er?" or "Did you make her?". The joke-teller then replies, "No, of her own accord." However, when Rowan says, "I say, I say, I say, my wife's gone to Jamaica," Richard replies, "Of her own accord?" which ruins the whole joke and causes Rowan to swear loudly and give up telling jokes to Richard.

Personnel
Rowan Atkinson – joke-teller
Richard Curtis – joke receiver
Howard Goodall – musical accompaniment

Live in Belfast track listing
Side one
"Man in Seat C23"
"Sir Marcus Browning M.P."
"Mary Jane"
"The Wedding a. The Vicar"
"The Wedding b. The Best Man"
"The Wedding c. The Father of the Bride"
"I Hate the French"
"Interval Announcement"
Side two
"Do Bears Sha la la"
"Senator Brea's Dead"
"The Devil"
"Impatient Man in Queue Behind Student"
"Station Announcement"
"Joke"

1980 works
Comedy sketches
Live performances
Works by Richard Curtis
Works by Rowan Atkinson